Hill Island Farm, also known as Noxontown Farm, is a historic home located in Townsend, New Castle County, Delaware.  It was built about 1790, and is a -story, five-bay brick dwelling with interior brick chimneys at both gable ends. It has a gable roof with dormers.  The house measures approximately 48 feet by 19 feet and has a center passage plan. It is in the Federal style.

It was listed on the National Register of Historic Places in 1992.

References

Houses on the National Register of Historic Places in Delaware
Federal architecture in Delaware
Houses completed in 1790
Houses in New Castle County, Delaware
National Register of Historic Places in New Castle County, Delaware